Robert Zimmermann (born May 21, 1963) is a German former footballer. He spent one season in the Bundesliga with 1. FC Kaiserslautern.

Honours
 Bundesliga champion: 1991.

External links
 

1963 births
Living people
East German footballers
German footballers
Bundesliga players
FC Carl Zeiss Jena players
1. FC Kaiserslautern II players
1. FC Kaiserslautern players
KSV Hessen Kassel players
Association football forwards